Make Life Skate Life is a non-profit organization that works to create community-built skateparks around the world.

Completed Skatepark Projects 

 2013 — Holystoked Skatepark — ⁣Bangalore, India
 2014 —⁣ Pura Pura Skatepark⁣ — ⁣La Paz, Bolivia
 2014 — ⁣7Hills Skatepark ⁣— ⁣Amman, Jordan
 2015 —⁣ Pushing Myanmar⁣ — ⁣Yangon, Myanmar
 2016 — ⁣Addis Skatepark⁣ — ⁣Addis Ababa, Ethiopia
 2018 —⁣ Suli Skatepark⁣ — ⁣Sulaymaniyah, Iraq

References

External links
 Make Life Skate Life

Skateboarding
Skateboarding organizations